"Monster" is a song by British rapper Professor Green. This is the third single from his second album, Alive Till I'm Dead, featuring uncredited vocals from British singer and rapper Example. It was released on 1 October 2010 by digital download and on 4 October 2010 by CD single. The song was added to the BBC Radio 1 A-List.

Critical reception
Fraser McAlpine of BBC Chart Blog gave the song a positive review stating:

Oh now this IS interesting. A Professor Green song which is not largely dependent on a sample from an older hit song, a chance for him to stand on his own two feet and put something which is wholly new out there into the world, now that he's got a bit of a platform to stand on and a LOT of people are listening. Here's the song which is designed to firmly cement the Prof in everyone's mind as a force for good in the world of music. Here's the song which says he can do it on his own. Here's the song which...well...does anyone else feel like something is missing?

I can't quite put my finger on what it is, either. I mean the Prof is the Prof innee? You either like that evil pixie voice of his or you don't. And if you're at all offended by his one-liners - the Peter Andre one is a particular favourite of mine - you'll have been just as irked by 'Just Be Good To Green'. But I'm not and I wasn't.

And it's not the lack of Lily Allen which is the root of the problem either. She did bring a fantastic face-slapping counterpoint to his daft bragging, but I think we're all old enough and clever enough to deal with someone showing off, aren't we? .

Music video
At the beginning of the music video a sample from Professor Greens earlier songs Jungle can be heard on the radio playing in the background.
The video for "Monster" was shot on location at Carnesky's Ghost Train based on Blackpool's Promenade. The majority of the scenes are shot on location but some scenes are shot on the Promenade showing the 2010 Illuminations. The video was directed by Henry Scholfield and featured scenery designed by Heckford.

Track listing

Chart performance
"Monster" debuted on the UK Singles Chart at number 86 following strong downloading from the album, Alive Till I'm Dead, the single also debuted at number 26 on the UK R&B Chart. On 3 October 2010, the single re-entered the UK Top 100 at number 51 and climbed to number 13 on the R&B Chart. Upon release, the single climbed to number 29; marking Professor Green's third consecutive Top 40 single and Example's fifth consecutive Top 40 single.

Release history

References

2010 singles
Example (musician) songs
Professor Green songs
Song recordings produced by Mojam
2010 songs
Songs written by Example (musician)
Songs written by Professor Green
Virgin Records singles
Songs written by Iyiola Babalola
Songs written by Mustafa Omer